Turbonilla pumila is a species of sea snail, a marine gastropod mollusk in the family Pyramidellidae, the pyrams and their allies.

Distribution
This species occurs in the following locations:
 Belgian Exclusive Economic Zone
 European waters (ERMS scope)
 Greek Exclusive Economic Zone
 Irish Exclusive economic Zone
 Portuguese Exclusive Economic Zone
 Spanish Exclusive Economic Zone
 United Kingdom Exclusive Economic Zone
 Wimereux

References

External links
 To CLEMAM
 To Encyclopedia of Life
 To World Register of Marine Species

pumila
Gastropods described in 1876